Danielle Pinnock (born May 11, 1988) is an American actress, writer, and comedian. Pinnock is a main cast member on the CBS series Ghosts (2021– ), where she plays the 1920s Prohibition era jazz singer “Alberta.”

She held a supporting role as “Ms. Ingram” on the CBS comedy Young Sheldon (2017–2020) and has acted in This Is Us, Workaholics, A Black Lady Sketch Show, and others.

Early life and education 
Pinnock was born in Boston, Massachusetts to Jamaican immigrant parents, and from age 10 was raised in Teaneck, New Jersey. Beginning in fifth grade, she performed in local theater productions at school and at the Garage Theater Group. In high school at Saddle River Day School, she was active in performing arts activities. Her father died when she was 16.

She received her bachelor's degree in theater and communications from Temple University, and there met fellow student Quinta Brunson. She received her graduate degree in acting from the Royal Birmingham Conservatoire. She interviewed approximately 300 people for her one-woman dissertation show Body/Courage, which centers body image and diet culture, and went on to perform the show over a five-year period. Pinnock later received a fellowship to train in improv and sketch comedy at Second City in Chicago.

Career 
Pinnock moved to Los Angeles in 2016 and was cast as an understudy for the Robert O’Hara play Barbecue, staged at Geffen Playhouse and directed by Colman Domingo. Shortly after, she was cast in her first television role on NBC's This Is Us. She has also appeared on the series Get Shorty, Workaholics, A Black Lady Sketch Show and done voice acting for the programs The Boss Baby: Back in Business, Where’s Waldo?, and ThunderCats Roar. From 2017, for seasons 1–4, Pinnock was a supporting character on Young Sheldon.

In 2018, she created the Instagram series Hashtag Booked to comment on the barriers encountered by Black women in the entertainment industry. She and co-creator LaNisa Renée Frederick received a Webby Award honor for the series. After the onset of the COVID-19 pandemic in 2020, Pinnock gained wider prominence for her comedic videos posted to her Instagram and TikTok. She was named to Backstage's list of 25 On-the-Rise Performers You Need to Know in 2022.

Pinnock is a main cast member on the 2021 CBS comedy Ghosts, on which she plays Alberta, a 1920s era jazz singer. Although she has no formal vocal training, she started to take lessons after she was cast. Salon hailed her acting as one of 10 breakout performances of 2021. 

Unmentionables, an adult animated series she co-created with Punam Patel is in development with 20th Century. The series is produced by Taraji P. Henson and Anthony Hemingway. Pinnock hosted the 37th Artios Awards.

Personal life 
Pinnock resides in Los Angeles. She is married to British dialect coach Jack Wallace, whom she met while in her graduate program at Royal Birmingham Conservatoire.

Filmography

Television

Film

Awards and nominations 
 2020 – Webby Award Honoree, Social, Arts & Entertainment (for Hashtag Booked)
 2022 – Nominee, HCA TV Award, Best Supporting Actress in a Broadcast Network or Cable Series, Comedy (for Ghosts)

References

External links 
 Official Instagram

1988 births
Living people
21st-century American actresses
American women comedians
American women screenwriters
Actresses from New Jersey
American people of Jamaican descent
Temple University alumni
Entertainers from New Jersey
People from Teaneck, New Jersey
African-American female comedians